Skaramagas (also spelled Skaramangas) is a port town in the western part of the Athens agglomeration, Greece. It is part of the municipality of Haidari. It is known for its large shipyard. It took its name by the Chiot merchant Amvrosios Skaramagas.

Geography
Skaramagas is situated on the east coast of the Bay of Elefsina, a bay of the Saronic Gulf. The Aigaleo mountain to the east separates it from the rest of Athens. Skaramagas is 5 km west of Chaidari town centre, 6 km south of Aspropyrgos, 7 km southeast of Elefsina, and 11 km west of Athens city centre. Greek National Road 8 (the old Athens - Corinth - Patras road) passes through Skaramagas.

Shipyard

Since 1937 Skaramagas harbour has been home to a shipyard of the Hellenic Navy. After destruction in World War II, it was refounded as a commercial shipyard in 1957, the Hellenic Shipyards Co. In 2002, the port became entirely owned by a German group of investors under the industrial leadership of Howaldtswerke-Deutsche Werft, which became a subsidiary of ThyssenKrupp in 2005.

In 1973, the Skaramagas harbour was the scene of an experiment carried out by Greek scientist Ioannis Sakkas, to test whether or not it was possible for Archimedes to use focused sunlight as a "heat ray" to burn Roman ships during the Siege of Syracuse (214–212 BC). This event is mentioned in ancient accounts but often doubted by modern historians.

Historical population

References

External links
Official website of Municipality of Chaidari 
Hellenic Shipyards Co.

Populated places in West Athens (regional unit)